Gustav Lechner (17 February 1913 – 5 February 1987) was a footballer who represented both the Yugoslavian and Croatian national sides.

Club career
Born in Osijek and nicknamed Lembika, he spent his early career with Slavija Osijek and BSK Belgrade; while playing with the latter he won 3 Yugoslav titles and graduated from law school. In 1941 he and teammate Ernest Dubac joined Građanski Zagreb. At the end of the war, he became player-manager of Proleter Osijek.

International career
Lechner made his debut for Yugoslavia in an August 1931 friendly match against Czechoslovakia and earned a total of 44 caps scoring no goals. He then played 12 matches under the flag of the Independent State of Croatia, a World War II-era puppet state of Nazi Germany. His final international was an April 1944 friendly against Slovakia.

Coaching career
After retiring as a player in 1949, Lechner became a coach and managed Metalac Osijek, Dinamo Pančevo, Vojvodina Novi Sad, Dinamo Zagreb, Velež Mostar, Slavonija Požega and NK Zagreb.

Death
Lechner died on 5 February 1987 in Zagreb, and was buried on 11 February at the Saint Anne Cemetery in his hometown of Osijek.

Honours
BSK Belgrade
Yugoslav First League: 1934–35, 1935–36, 1938–39
Serbian League: 1940–41

Građanski Zagreb
Independent State of Croatia championship: 1943

References

External links
 

1913 births
1987 deaths
Sportspeople from Osijek
Croatian people of German descent
Yugoslav people of German descent
Association football midfielders
Yugoslav footballers
Yugoslavia international footballers
Croatian footballers
Croatia international footballers
Dual internationalists (football)
NK Osijek players
OFK Beograd players
HŠK Građanski Zagreb players
Yugoslav First League players
Yugoslav football managers
NK Osijek managers
FK Vojvodina managers
GNK Dinamo Zagreb managers
FK Velež Mostar managers
NK Zagreb managers
Burials at Saint Anne Cemetery